Shawnigan Lake is a lake on southern Vancouver Island, located to the west of Saanich Inlet and to the south of the Cowichan Valley region. Its aboriginal name in the Hul'qumi'num language is Showe'luqun.

Geology and soils

Bedrock around the southern two-thirds of the lake is meta-igneous rock of Lower Paleozoic age which is rich in mafic minerals except along southeastern shores where felsic minerals dominate. Bands of marble up to several meters thick are scattered within this metamorphic complex. Around northern shores are volcanic rocks of variable composition from the Jurassic period.

Soils around the lake are mostly well drained or rapidly drained gravelly sandy loams or gravelly loamy sands with brown podzolic profile development. Some meet the definition of podzols under the current Canadian system of soil classification. A small area of peat lies near the southern end of the community of Shawnigan Lake.

Ecology

Fish in the lake include rainbow trout, cutthroat trout, kokanee salmon and smallmouth bass. Their populations are sufficient to support a recreational fishery.

Features
Memory Island Provincial Park, a small islet in the lake, was founded in memorial to two Lake residents lost during the Second World War.  Also, a local park (Old Mill Park) contains the remains of a lumber mill that was built to support the fledgling village when it was founded nearly one hundred years ago.  The mill burned in a fire several years after construction, and the old wooden supports from the mill are still visible in the lake.

Climate

References
Day, J.H., Farstad,L. and Laird, D.G. (1959). Soil Survey of Southeast Vancouver Island and Gulf Islands, British Columbia. B.C. Soil Survey, Rept. No. 6, Can. Dept. Agric.
Muller, J.E. (1980). Geology Victoria Map 1553A. Ottawa: Geological Survey of Canada.
Jungen, J.R. (1985). Soils of Southern Vancouver Island. Victoria: Ministry of Environment Technical Report 17.
Shawnigan Lake at VancouverIsland.com

Lakes of Vancouver Island
Southern Vancouver Island
Malahat Land District